Solomon Sharfman was a rabbi of Orthodox Jewry who built the Flatbush Modern Orthodox Jewish community in the mid-1900s.

Life
Solomon Joseph Sharfman was born on November 1, 1915, in Treblinka, Poland; his family came to the United States five years later. His father, Rabbi Label Sharfman, worked as a shochet in Newark, New Jersey. He attended Yeshivas Chofetz Chaim and reportedly made up the name "The Rabbinical Seminary of America" when registering the new institution with the City of New York, because the city did not want to accept a Hebrew name.

For over forty years, from 1938 to 1984, Sharfman was the rabbi of Young Israel of Flatbush, the pulpit from which he led American Jewry. For two years, from 1956 to 1958, he served as president of the Rabbinical Council of America, and from 1969 to 1971, he was president of the Synagogue Council of America.

Rabbi Sharfman maintained a relationship with rabbinic luminaries of the era, such as Rabbi Joseph B. Soloveitchik and Rabbi Moshe Feinstein.

His writings are included in a number of compilations of rabbinic literature ("Homer LeDerush") of the National Council of Young Israel. He died in his sleep on December 19, 2004.

Legacy

Communal
Rabbi Sharfman was an early (1950s) opponent to New York's Sunday Blue laws.

In 1989 he helped focus the attention of the National Council of Young Israel on JustOneLife, an organization that provides professional counseling and financial assistance, enabling and empowering mothers to choose to continue their pregnancies to term. As of 2017 the organization is still in operation.

Personal
He was survived by his wife and their sons and daughters, along with many grandchildren and greatgrandchildren.

His son, Rabbi Label Sharfman, founded and heads the Bnot Torah Seminary in the Sanhedria Murchevet neighborhood in Jerusalem, Israel, otherwise known as "Sharfman's". Notable grandchildren include Rabbi Eliakim Koenigsberg, Rosh Yeshiva at Yeshivat R' Yitzchak Elchanan (RIETS). A sister of Rabbi Koenigsberg is married to Rabbi Meir Orlian, who  is the rabbi and Dayan of a synagogue in Yad Binyamin and teaches in Yeshivat Shaalvim and Kerem BeYavneh. Another sister, Dr. Chani (née Koenigsberg) Maybruch EdD, MA, is a relationship educator and coach along with her husband Rabbi Shmuel Maybruch. His youngest grandson is R' David Diament, honorary lecturer at The 2018 Dr. Abraham S. and Phyllis Weissman Memorial Rabbinic Lecture in RIETS.

References

External links
 Forward to the first volume of the RCA journal, Tradition, written by Rabbi Sharfman (1958)
 involvement, Orthodox Jews Seek Court Ban on Mixed Seating in Synagogue (JTA)
 List of (47) JTA articles detailing Rabbi Sharfman's persistence  in fighting for Torah-true Judaism in the USA and worldwide, Jewish Telegraphic Agency archives

1915 births
2004 deaths
American Orthodox rabbis
Polish emigrants to the United States
20th-century American rabbis
21st-century American Jews